Y15 may refer to:

Greek submarine Argonaftis (Y15) or HMS Virulent (P95), V-class submarine of the Royal Navy
Y-15 Aix/Les Milles or Aix-en-Provence Aerodrome in the Bouches-du-Rhône department of the Provence-Alpes-Côte d'Azur region of France
Youth Bandy World Championship World Championship Y15, for boys' teams up to age 15
 Y15, 1,2,4,5-benzenetetraamine tetrahydrochloride, an FAK inhibitor intended for cancer